This is a list of mechanical engineers, noted for their contribution to the field of mechanical engineering.

See also List of engineers for links to other engineering professions.



A 
 Ahmed Zulfikar (1952–2010) – Entrepreneur and businessman
Al-Jazari (1136–1206) – polymath, numerous mechanical innovations
 Al-Zarqali (1029–1087) – instrument maker, astrologer, and leading astronomers
 Archimedes (c. 287–212 BC) – polymath, inventor of the screw pump
 Richard Arkwright (1733–1792) – credited with inventing the spinning frame but most notable for contributions to the modern factory system
 William George Armstrong, 1st Baron Armstrong (1810–1900) – hydraulic power pioneer, founder of Armstrong Whitworth

B 

 Charles Babbage (1791–1871) – creator of the difference engine
 George Herman Babcock (1832–1893) – co-invented an improved safety water tube steam boiler, co-founder of Babcock & Wilcox
 Joseph Cyril Bamford (1916–2001) – founder of the JCB company, manufacturing heavy plant, and especially backhoes
 Eugenio Barsanti (1821–1864) – early developer of internal combustion engine
 Karl Benz (1844–1929) – generally regarded as the inventor of the gasoline-powered automobile, founder of Mercedes-Benz
 Henry Bessemer (1813–1898) – best known as the creator of the Bessemer Process
 John Blenkinsop (1783–1831) – steam locomotive pioneer, developed rack and pinion railway system
 Thomas Bouch (1822–1880) – railway engineer, helped develop the roll-on/roll-off train ferry
 Matthew Boulton (1728–1809) – steam engineer, associate of James Watt
 Joseph Bramah (1748–1814) – hydraulic power pioneer and inventor of the hydraulic press
 Isambard Kingdom Brunel (1805–1859) – design contributions include the Great Western Railway and the SS Great Eastern
 William Brunton (1777–1851) – early steam power pioneer, inventor of the Brunton's Mechanical Traveller
 Oliver Bulleid (1882–1970) – railway engineer
 David Bushnell (1742–1824) – creator of the Turtle, credited as the first military submarine

C 

 Gerolamo Cardano (1501–1576) – numerous mechanical inventions including the combination lock, gimbal, Cardan shaft, and Cardan grille
 Nicolas Léonard Sadi Carnot (1796–1832) – physicist and military engineer
 Willis Carrier (1876–1950) – pioneered the design and manufacture of modern air conditioning systems
 Edmund Cartwright (1743–1823) – inventor of the first commercial power loom
 George Cayley (1773–1857) – aerodynamics pioneer and founding member of the British Association for the Advancement of Science
 Colin Chapman (1928–1982) – automotive engineer, founder of Lotus Cars
 André Citroën (1878–1935) – founder of Citroën automotive, known for application of double-helical gears
 Joseph Clement (1779–1844) – best known as the maker of Babbage's difference engine
 Dugald Clerk (1854–1932) – inventor of the two-stroke engine
 Demetrius Comino (1902–1988) – inventor of Dexion slotted angle steel construction system
 Peter Cooper (1791–1883) – designed and built the first American steam locomotive, the Tom Thumb, and founded the Cooper Union for the Advancement of Science and Art
 William R. Cosentini (1911–1954) – founder of Cosentini Associates
 Thomas Russell Crampton (1816–1888) – inventor of the Crampton locomotive and an early advocate of the Channel Tunnel
 Nicolas-Joseph Cugnot (1725–1804) – early developer of a self-propelled (steam) vehicle

D 
 Leonardo da Vinci (1452–1519) – polymath
 Rudolf Diesel (1858–1913) – inventor of the diesel engine
 Bryan Donkin (1768–1855) – associated with paper making and printing machinery, tinned food, beam engines, gas valves and the Babbage difference engine; employed on civil engineering projects such as the Thames Tunnel, Chatham Docks and Caledonian Canal; member of Royal Society of Arts, Institution of Civil Engineers, and the Smeatonian Society of Civil Engineers; founder member of the Royal Astronomical Society
 Cornelius Drebbel (1572–1633) – inventor of the first navigable submarine
 Keith Duckworth (1933–2005) – designer of the Cosworth DFV

E 

 Thomas Alva Edison (1847–1931) – inventor, entrepreneur
 Chaim Elata (born 1929) – Israeli professor of mechanical engineering, President of Ben-Gurion University of the Negev, and Chairman of the Israel Public Utility Authority for Electricity
 John Ericsson (1803–1889) – steam engine design, propeller design, iron clad warships (USS Monitor)
 Oliver Evans (1755–1819) – steam power pioneer and inventor, best known for his "Oruktor Amphibolos"

F 

 William Fairbairn (1789–1874) – steam power pioneer, developer of early high-pressure boiler (Lancashire boiler)
 Harry Ferguson (1884–1960) – agricultural equipment engineer, founder of Ferguson Company (later Massey Ferguson)
 Giovanni Fontana (c. 1395 – c. 1455) – fifteenth-century Venetian engineer
 Henry Ford (1863–1947) – automotive engineer and industrialist, founder of Ford Motor Company
 Benoît Fourneyron (1802–1867) – pioneered early practical water turbine
 Robert Fulton (1765–1815) – credited with the development of the first commercial steamboat
 Yuan-Cheng Fung (1919–2019) – American bio-engineer, a founding figure of bioengineering, tissue engineering, and the "founder of modern biomechanics"

G 
 Emile Gagnan (1900–1979) – co-inventor (with Cousteau) of the diving regulator used in SCUBA equipment
 Henry Laurence Gantt (1861–1919) – inventor of the Gantt chart
 Blasco de Garay (1500–1552) – early steam power pioneer and developer of paddle wheels as a substitute for oars
 Herbert William Garratt (1864–1913) – inventor of the Garratt system of articulated locomotives
 Daniel Gooch (1816–1889) – first chief mechanical engineer of the Great Western Railway
 John Viret Gooch (1812–1900) – locomotive superintendent of the London and South Western Railway
 J.E. Gordon (1913–1998) – engineering author and developer of composite materials
 George B. Grant (1849–1917) – worked on improved calculators and gear industry pioneer
 Nigel Gresley (1876–1941) – steam locomotive engineer, developed Gresley conjugated valve gear
 Ravi Grover (born 1949) – Indian nuclear scientist and mechanical engineer; widely given credit for building India's nuclear bomb
 John Josiah Guest (1785–1852) – manager of the Dowlais Ironworks, Wales
 Goldsworthy Gurney (1793–1875) – inventor and steam power pioneer, known for his Gurney Steam Carriage

H 

 Timothy Hackworth (1786–1850) – early steam locomotive designer, associate of William Hedley and George Stephenson
 James Harrison (1816–1893) – pioneer in the field of mechanical refrigeration
 William Hedley (1779–1843) – railway pioneer, built the first practical steam locomotive relying only on the adhesion of wheels to rails
 Beulah Louise Henry (1887–1973) – nicknamed "Lady Edison", patents included a bobbin-free sewing machine and vacuum ice cream freezer
 Hero of Alexandria (c. 10–70 AD) – described many inventions including the aeolipile and the windwheel
 August Horch (1868–1951) – automotive engineer, founder of Audi
 Jonathan Hornblower (1753–1815) – steam power pioneer, developed the first compound steam engine
 Elias Howe (1819–1867) – refined Hunt's ideas, was granted the first U.S. patent for a sewing machine using a lockstitch design

I 
 Alec Issigonis (1906–1988) – automotive engineer associated with the development of the Mini

J
 Joseph Marie Jacquard (1752–1834) – invented the Jacquard loom, forerunner of modern digital computers (also see Basile Bouchon)
 György Jendrassik (1898–1954) – developed first working turboprop engine (the Jendrassik Cs-1)

L 
 Frederick Lanchester (1868–1946) – polymath with contributions in automotive and aviation engineering, co-founder of Lanchester Motor Company
 Gustaf de Laval (1845–1913) – developer of the De Laval nozzle, contributions in steam and dairy engineering, founder of Alfa Laval
 Gottfried Wilhelm Leibniz (1646–1716) – polymath who invented, among other things, the Leibniz wheel

M 
 Ma Jun (fl. 220-265) – 3rd-century China, invented the south-pointing chariot, mechanical puppet theaters, chain pumps, improved silk looms
 Felice Matteucci (1808–1887) – early developer of internal combustion engine
 Henry Maudslay (1771–1831) – considered a founding father of machine tool technology, helped perfect the hydraulic press
 Elijah McCoy (1843–1929) – African Canadian inventor, contributions include automatic lubricator for steam engines
 Eckart Meiburg (born 1959) – German/American researcher, notable contributions to Computational fluid dynamics
 Andrew Meikle (1719–1811) – contributions include threshing machine and windmill sails
 Otto Metzger (1885–1961) – German/British engineer and inventor of impact extrusion of containers
 Thomas Midgley, Jr. (1889–1944) – developed tetraethyllead (TEL) and chlorofluorocarbons (CFCs)
 Samuel Morey (1762–1843) – steamship and internal combustion engine pioneer
 James Morgan (1776?–1856) – Applied Materials CEO
 William Murdoch (1754–1839) – associate of Watt, improved steam engine (sun and planet gearing), also developed gas lighting
 Gordon Murray (born 1946) – Formula One, Brabham BT46B, McLaren F1
 Matthew Murray (1765–1826) – steam engine designer, built one of the first commercially viable steam locomotives (Salamanca)
 Mohammad Reza Eslami (born 1945) is an Iranian scientist and professor of Mechanical Engineering at Tehran Polytechnic (Amirkabir University of Technology), Tehran, Iran.

N 

 James Nasmyth (1808–1890) – inventor of the steam hammer and other important machine tools
 Thomas Newcomen (1664–1729) – inventor of the first practical steam engine for pumping water
 James Henry Northrop (1856–1940) – invented shuttle-charging mechanism which led to the fully automatic Northrup Power Loom

O 

 Nicolaus Otto (1832–1891) – developer of the first commercially viable four-stroke engine

P 

 Denis Papin (1647–1712) – inventor of the steam digester, forerunner of the steam engine
 Charles Algernon Parsons (1854–1931) – steam and power engineer, inventor of compound steam turbine
 Ferdinand Porsche (1875–1951) – automotive engineer, best known for creating the Volkswagen Beetle

Q 
 Muhammad Hafeez Qureshi (1930–2007) – weapons scientist, aerodynamicist, rocket engineer and missile technologist

R 

 Adele Racheli (1894–?) – Italian mechanical engineer and founder of a patent protection office in Milan in 1925.
Agostino Ramelli (c. 1531–1600) – inventor of the bookwheel as well as various water-powered inventions (clockwork, treadmill, pump)
 John Ramsbottom (1814–1897) – inventor of the tamper-proof spring safety valve and the displacement lubricator
 William John Macquorn Rankine (1820–1872) – major contributor to thermodynamics, heat engine theory and metal fatigue
 George Rennie (1791–1866) – among other developments, a pioneer in food processing equipment (biscuit, corn, chocolate mills)
 Osbourne Reynolds (1842–1912) – major contributor to the science of fluid dynamics and heat transfer
 Harry Ricardo (1885–1974) – internal combustion engine designer and researcher
 Richard Roberts (1789–1864) – developer of high-precision machine tools which helped enable mass production
 Alfred H. Rzeppa (1885–1965) – developer of the constant-velocity joint

S 

 Ralph Sarich (born 1938) – invented orbital engine
 Thomas Savery (c. 1650–1715) – early steam engine patent holder, author of A Miner's Friend; or An Engine to Raise Water by Fire
 Per Georg Scheutz (1785–1873) – pioneer in computer technology (Scheutzian calculation engine)
 Dan Shechtman (born 1941) – discovered Icosahedral Phase
 Carl Wilhelm Siemens (1823–1883) – inventor of the regenerative furnace
 Igor Sikorsky (1889–1972) – aviation engineer, inventor of the single-rotor helicopter, founder of Sikorsky Aircraft Company
 Isaac Singer (1811–1875) – credited with improvements in lockstitch sewing machine, founder of the Singer Sewing Machine Company
 John Smeaton (1724–1792) – principally a civil engineer, but made numerous improvements to Newcomen's steam engine
 Edward Somerset, 2nd Marquess of Worcester, (c. 1601–1667) – numerous mechanical innovations as described in "Century of Inventions" (1663)
 Sir William Stanier (1876–1965) – Chief Mechanical Engineer of the London, Midland and Scottish Railway
 George Stephenson (1781–1848) – known as the "father of railways", founder of the Institution of Mechanical Engineers
 Robert Stephenson (1803–1859) – railway engineer; son of George Stephenson
 Robert Stirling (1790–1878) – inventor of the Stirling engine
 Su Song (1020–1101) China – first to use an escapement mechanism (see Yi Xing below) and chain drive to operate his astronomical clock tower
 Dr. Victor Szebehely (1921–1997) – aerospace engineering and celestial mechanics

T 
 Taqi al-Din (1526–1585) – polymath, numerous mechanical innovations
 Nikola Tesla (1856–1943) – Serbian electrical and mechanical engineer contributing to the development of AC motors and power delivery
 Torine Torines (1876–1944) – pioneer Swedish sewing machine mechanic engineer
 John Tregoning (1840s–1920s) – American mechanical engineer, who wrote the first books on factory management
 Richard Trevithick (1771–1833) – steam power pioneer, designer of early high-pressure boiler (Cornish boiler) and "Puffing Devil" locomotive

V 
 Jacques de Vaucanson (1709–1782) – credited with creating early robots (automata) as well as the automated loom
 Richard Velazquez – automotive designer for Honda R&D Americas, Inc. and Porsche AG
 Sir M Vishweswarayya (1861–1962) – chief designer, flood protection systems, Hyderabad; chief engineer, Krishna Raja Sagara dam, Mandya
 Wernher Von Braun (1912–1977) – mechanical engineer, space architect credited with inventing the V-2 rocket for Nazi Germany and the Saturn V for the United States

W 

 Felix Wankel (1902–1988) – inventor of the Wankel Rotary Engine
 James Watt (1736–1819) – inventor of the Watt steam engine whose development helped enable the Industrial Revolution
 Samuel T. Wellman (1847–1919) – inventor and industrialist responsible for numerous steel industry innovations
 Eli Whitney (1765–1825) – inventor of the cotton gin
 Joseph Whitworth (1803–1887) – associated with standardizing thread pitch and techniques enabling precision machining
 Martin Wiberg (1826–1905) – computer technology pioneer (logarithmic table machine)
 Walter Gordon Wilson (1874–1957) – inventor of the Wilson preselector gearbox
 Ludwig Wittgenstein (1889–1951) – aerospace engineer turned philosopher
 Nathaniel C. Wyeth (1911–1990) – developed polyethylene terephthalate (PET) beverage container

Y 
 Yi Xing (683–727) China – first to use an escapement mechanism in operating a water-powered armillary sphere

Z
 Zhang Heng (78–139) – 1st century-2nd century China, inventor of first hydraulic-powered armillary sphere, and first seismometer

References

Mechanical engineers
Mechanical engineering